Longidorus maximus is a plant pathogenic nematode.

See also 
 List of hemp diseases

References

Further reading
Sturhan, D. "Der pflanzenparasitische Nematode Longidorus maximus, seine Biologie und Ökologie mit Untersuchungen an L. elongatus un. Xiphinema diversicaudatum." Zool 50 (1963): 129–93.

Diplogasteria
Agricultural pest nematodes
Hemp diseases